The Emilia-Romagna regional election of 2005 took place on 3–4 April 2005.

The incumbent President Vasco Errani, a member of the social democratic Democrats of the Left, was re-elected defeating by a landslide Carlo Monaco, the candidate of the centre-right coalition led by Forza Italia.

Electoral system
Regional elections in Emilia-Romagna were ruled by the "Tatarella law" (approved in 1995), which provided for a mixed electoral system: four fifths of the regional councilors were elected in provincial constituencies by proportional representation, using the largest remainder method with a droop quota and open lists, while the residual votes and the unassigned seats were grouped into a "single regional constituency", where the whole ratios and the highest remainders were divided with the Hare method among the provincial party lists; one fifth of the council seats instead was reserved for regional lists and assigned with a majoritarian system: the leader of the regional list that scored the highest number of votes was elected to the presidency of the Region while the other candidates were elected regional councilors.

A threshold of 3% had been established for the provincial lists, which, however, could still have entered the regional council if the regional list to which they were connected had scored at least 5% of valid votes.

The panachage was also allowed: the voter can indicate a candidate for the presidency but prefer a provincial list connected to another candidate.

Parties and candidates

Results

References

2005 elections in Italy
2005 regional election
April 2005 events in Europe
2005